Allbritton is a surname. Notable people with the surname include:

Chris Allbritton, American journalist
Joe Allbritton (1924–2012), American businessman
Louise Allbritton (1920–1979), American actress
Nancy Allbritton, American biologist
Robert Allbritton, American businessman